The Speedway Grand Prix are a series of stand-alone motorcycle speedway events over the course of a season used to determine the Speedway World Champion and below are a list of records associated with the event since its inception in 1995. From the 2007-2019 seasons, the format was changed with points scored for every ride instead of the set points scoring system used until 2020 when a new format based on overall positions was introduced with points scored in heats only used to determine a rider's progress in a Grand Prix.

Statistics up to date as of the 2022 Speedway Grand Prix of Poland IV.

Grand Prix Wins

Grand Prix Wins (by country)

Grand Prix Finals (top 20)

Grand Prix Points (top 20)

Grand Prix Appearances (top 20)

Grand Prix Rostrums (top 20)

Grand Prix Wins in 1 season

Grand Prix Wins in succession

Grand Prix Finals in 1 year

Grand Prix Finals in succession

Grand Prix Points in 1 year (top 10)

Grand Prix Wins/Apps Ratio (top 10)

Minimum of 2 Grand Prix wins required.

Grand Prix Appearances without a win (top 10)

Grand Prix Appearances without a final (top 10)

Oldest riders to win a Grand Prix

Oldest riders to make a Grand Prix appearance

See also 
 2022 Speedway Grand Prix
 Speedway Grand Prix

References

World Speedway Championships